Timothy Kelleher (1862 - 27 March 1944) was an Irish hurler who played for Cork Championship club Aghabullogue. He played for the Cork senior hurling team for one season.

Playing career

Aghabullogue

Kelleher joined the Aghabullogue club when it was founded in the early years of the Gaelic Athletic Association. On 13 July 1890, Kelleher lined out for the team when Aghabullogue defeated Aghada by 7-03 to 1-01 to win the Cork Championship.

Cork

Kelleher made his only appearance for the Cork hurling team on 16 November 1890 when Cork defeated Wexford by 1-06 to 2-02 in the All-Ireland final.

Honours

Aghabullogue
Cork Senior Hurling Championship (1): 1890

Cork
All-Ireland Senior Hurling Championship (1): 1890
Munster Senior Hurling Championship (1): 1890

References

External links

 Thady Kelleher obituary

1862 births
1944 deaths
Aghabullogue hurlers
Cork inter-county hurlers
All-Ireland Senior Hurling Championship winners